An election of Members of the European Parliament from Hungary to the European Parliament was held on 26 May 2019,
electing the 21 members of the Hungary delegation to the European Parliament as part of the European elections held across the European Union.

Electoral system

Date of the vote 
European Parliament Elections are held every five years in the European Union. The vote had to take place from 23 to 26 May 2019, but the member states could set the exact date. Since Hungarian law states elections can only take place on a Sunday, the only possible date was 26 May 2019. Accordingly, President János Áder announced on 4 March 2019 that the vote would be held on 26 May.

Background

Fidesz
During early 2019, the Hungarian government launched a poster campaign targeting European commission president Jean-Claude Juncker and Hungarian-American philanthropist George Soros. The government campaign accuses Juncker and Soros of wanting “to weaken member states’ rights to protect their own borders” and claims “they want …migrants’ visas”. Due to the poster campaign, some members of the European People's Party (EPP), which the Hungarian governing party Fidesz is a member of, started moves to remove it from the group.” Hungarian Prime Minister Viktor Orbán, called those who were calling for his removal from the EPP "Useful idiots".” In response to the political ad campaign, Manfred Weber, Spitzenkandidat of the EPP demanded Orbán apologize for and renounce the criticism levied against the EU by him and his party or face Fidesz's suspension from the EPP.

On 20 March 2019, the European People's Party voted to suspend the membership of Fidesz citing its anti-immigration stance, and personal attacks on Jean-Claude Juncker and George Soros. Prime Minister and Fidesz leader Viktor Orbán had threatened to pull out of the EPP if it was suspended.

Parties contesting
According to election law, Hungary consists of a single election district and all parties that collect 20,000 valid signatures from eligible citizens are put on the ballot. By the deadline (23 April 2019, 16:00), eleven parties or party alliances had submitted signature lists. Of those, two parties were refused registration, lacking a sufficient number of valid signatures : the United Hungarian National People's Party (EMNP) and the Tea Party Hungary (TPM). Nine qualified lists were approved by the National Election Committee (NVB) to be put on the ballot, of which two of them are shared lists. All parties represented in the Országgyűlés participated in the election, in addition to four extra-parliamentary parties. The parties appeared on the ballot papers in the following randomly drawn order:

Opinion polling

Results

By county and in the diaspora

European groups

List of seat winners

On the Fidesz–Christian Democratic People's Party list: (EPP Group)
László Trócsányi
József Szájer
Lívia Járóka
Tamás Deutsch
András Gyürk
Kinga Gál
György Hölvényi (KDNP)
Enikő Győri
Ádám Kósa
Andrea Bocskor
Andor Deli
Balázs Hidvéghi
Edina Tóth

On the Democratic Coalition list: (S&D)
Klára Dobrev
Csaba Molnár
Sándor Rónai
Attila Ara-Kovács

On the Momentum Movement list: (ALDE)
Katalin Cseh
Anna Donáth

On the Hungarian Socialist Party–Dialogue for Hungary list: (S&D)
István Ujhelyi

On the Jobbik list: (Non-inscrits)
Márton Gyöngyösi

Analysis

These elections marked the change of balance in Hungarian politics. Although Fidesz-KNDP remained largest and dominant party, but MSZP and Jobbik were replaced by Democratic Coalition and Momentum Movement as leading opposition parties. LMP was wiped off from political sphere. The results of the European elections in Hungary were also viewed with interest for their potential implications in the upcoming local elections in 2019. András Bódis of Válasz Online noted possibility that in some municipalities joint opposition candidates can defeat Fidesz-KNDP candidates.

Notes

References

European Parliament elections in Hungary
Hungary
2019 in Hungarian politics